Edward G. Nalbandian (December 29, 1927 – February 22, 2006) was the owner of Zachary All Clothing, a store he opened in the 1950s at 5467 Wilshire Boulevard (just west of La Brea Avenue) in Los Angeles, California.  The store was located in the Miracle Mile shopping district of Wilshire Blvd.

In the 1950s and 1960s, Nalbandian became a minor celebrity, making frequent appearances in commercials for his store and even on talk shows such as The Tom Duggan Show.  Most of these commercials featured the line "Come on down to 5-4-6-7 Wilshire Boulevard".  In one commercial, Nalbandian said of his low prices, "My friends all ask me, 'Eddie, are you kidding?' And I tell them no, my friend, I am not kidding."  This inspired the Frank Zappa song Eddie, Are You Kidding? from the album Just Another Band from L.A. (1972), as well as Mark Volman's monologue to the audience in the track Once Upon a Time from the album You Can't Do That on Stage Anymore, Vol. 1 (1988).

In later years Nalbandian's son took over the store's operation. 5467 Wilshire is now occupied by a Walgreens drug store.

Nalbandian's son, Johnny J. Nalbandian, has been a Republican candidate in Los Angeles politics. [You want to check that—According to his own website, his family didn't arrive in Los Angeles until the 1960s—after the founding of Zachary All. There may be a familial connection, but Johnny is not the son of Edward, not unless Edward's obituary (cited herein, still accessible) omitted him.

References

External links
Los Angeles Times obituary
Forest Lawn, Hollywood, Cemetery Grave

1927 births
2006 deaths
Deaths from Alzheimer's disease
Neurological disease deaths in the United States
American people of Armenian descent